Sanem may refer to:

Places
 Sanem, commune and town in south-western Luxembourg
 Sanem Castle in the Luxembourg town 
 Bascharage-Sanem railway station, railway station serving the towns of Bascharage and Sanem, in south-western Luxembourg
 Gmina Radomyśl nad Sanem, rural gmina (administrative district) in Stalowa Wola County, Subcarpathian Voivodeship, in south-eastern Poland
 Gmina Rudnik nad Sanem, urban-rural gmina (administrative district) in Nisko County, Subcarpathian Voivodeship, in south-eastern Poland
 Rudnik nad Sanem, town in Nisko County, Subcarpathian Voivodeship, Poland

Given name
 Sanem Çelik, (born 1975), Turkish actress and ballerina

Turkish feminine given names